Praearcturus is an extinct genus of scorpion known from the late Devonian of what is now Britain. It is the only genus in the family Praearcturidae and contains the single species Praearcturus gigas. The type fossil was discovered in Rowlestone, England, and was described in 1871 by Henry Woodward.

References 

Prehistoric scorpions